Rickenbach is the name of several places:

Germany
 Rickenbach, Baden-Württemberg

Switzerland
 Rickenbach, Basel-Landschaft
 Rickenbach, Lucerne
 Rickenbach, Schwyz
 Rickenbach, Solothurn
 Rickenbach, Thurgau
 Rickenbach, Zürich